52 Pick-Up is a 1986 American neo-noir crime film directed by John Frankenheimer and starring Roy Scheider, Ann-Margret, and Vanity. It is based on Elmore Leonard's 1974 novel of the same name, and is the second adaptation of it after The Ambassador (1984).

Plot
Harry Mitchell is a successful construction magnate living in the suburbs of Los Angeles, whose wife Barbara is running for city council. One day, Harry is confronted by three hooded blackmailers who demand $105,000 per year for a videotape of him and his mistress, a young stripper named Cini. Because of his wife's political aspirations he cannot go to the police; however, guilt eventually drives him to confess, and she kicks him out of their bedroom. 
 
Harry's stubborn inclination is to not surrender to the threats, and when his lawyer advises him that the blackmailers will never leave him alone, he refuses to pay. The trio kidnap Harry and force him to watch a video of Cini being murdered with a gun stolen from his house. They demand $105,000 a year for the rest of Harry's life in exchange for their silence. Harry, however, vows to get revenge.

Using deduction and his business contacts, Harry tracks down and confronts Alan Raimy, the leader of the blackmailers and an amateur adult filmmaker. Knowing he has a background in accounting, Harry shows Raimy his financial records, which indicate that the majority of his wealth is tied up and he can't afford $105,000. Raimy agrees to accept Harry's offer of $52,000 instead, at least as a first payment. However, Raimy also breaks into Harry's house posing as an insurance salesman and subtly threatens Barbara.

Through Doreen, a stripper who was friends with Cini, Harry learns the names of the other blackmailers: the sociopathic Bobby Shy and the cowardly Leo. He first makes Raimy suspicious by suggesting Leo gave up his name; Bobby, realizing the truth, violently interrogates Doreen but believes her when she says she didn't give him away. That night he breaks into the Mitchell house and tries to kill Harry, but Harry and Barbara overpower him. Harry realizes Raimy kept the revised deal to himself and tells Bobby as much before letting him go.

Leo, cracking under the pressure, confesses everything to Harry, saying he never wanted to hurt Cini and that both her body and the videotape have been disposed of. He also warns him that Raimy and Bobby will kill him and Barbara after the payment is made, since he knows who they are. Bobby later confronts Leo, who is planning to leave town, and kills him. Meanwhile, Raimy kidnaps Barbara and sedates her with drugs, to ensure Harry delivers the $52,000. He lures Bobby and Doreen to a warehouse and kills both of them before going to meet Harry.

Harry exchanges the money for Barbara, telling Raimy that if anything happens to them, his lawyer will send Raimy's fingerprints (from the financial records) to the police. Raimy had previously expressed interest in Harry’s sports car, so Harry offers it as a getaway vehicle. When Raimy turns the ignition key the doors lock, trapping him inside; the car then explodes in a ball of fire.

Cast
 Roy Scheider as Harry Mitchell
 Ann-Margret as Barbara Mitchell
 Vanity as Doreen
 John Glover as Alan Raimy
 Clarence Williams III as Bobby Shy
 Lonny Chapman as Jim O'Boyle
 Kelly Preston as Cynthia “Cini” Frazier
 Robert Trebor as Leo Franks
 Doug McClure as Mark Arveson
 Tom Byron as Party Goer  
 Randy West as Party Goer
 Ron Jeremy Hyatt as Party Goer
 Amber Lynn as Party Goer  
 Sharon Mitchell as Party Goer
 Jamie Gillis as Party Goer

Production 
Tomorrow Entertainment first acquired the rights to Elmore Leonard's novel 52 Pick-Up in 1972 and planned to begin filming an adaptation on January 1, 1973. However, the film was placed in turnaround and eventually acquired by The Cannon Group, Inc. in 1974, whose co-chairmen Menahem Golan and Yoram Globus changed the setting from Detroit to Tel Aviv and the identity of the blackmail victims to the family of the U.S. Ambassador to Israel. This version of the film, The Ambassador, was released in 1984. After John Frankenheimer read the book, he obtained permission from Golan and Globus to direct a more faithful adaptation. Filming was originally going to begin on April 9, 1986, in Pittsburgh, which was meant to stand in for the novel's original setting of Detroit. However, the filming and setting was moved to Los Angeles in order to save budgetary costs. The Mitchells' home was filmed in Hancock Park, while other scenes were filmed in Vine Street and Santa Monica Boulevard.

Release
52 Pick-Up opened in New York and Los Angeles on November 7, 1986. The film was distributed by the Cannon Group. It debuted poorly at the box office.

Reception
Patrick Goldstein, writing in the Los Angeles Times, described the film as "a dull, plodding thriller that finds Mitchell in a deadly war with a trio of crazed blackmailers." On the other hand, Roger Ebert, writing in the Chicago Sun-Times, claimed it "provides us with the best, most reprehensible villain of the year and uses his vile charm as the starting point for a surprisingly good film. ... This is a well-crafted movie by a man who knows how to hook the audience with his story; it's Frankenheimer's best work in years." The New York Times film critic Janet Maslin described it as "fast-paced, lurid, exploitative and loaded with malevolent energy. John Frankenheimer, who directed, hasn't done anything this darkly entertaining since Black Sunday." Tom Milne (Monthly Film Bulletin) described the film as "enjoyable, up to a point, as anything Frankenheimer has done in recent years." while noting that the weakness in the film was that "the protagonist and his wife are much too sketchily realised"

On Rotten Tomatoes the film has an approval rating of 47% based on reviews from 15 critics.

References

External links
 
 52 Pick-up at The Numbers
 52 Pick Up at Trailers From Hell

1986 films
1980s crime thriller films
American crime thriller films
American neo-noir films
1980s English-language films
Adultery in films
Films about businesspeople
Films about pornography
Films based on American novels
Films based on works by Elmore Leonard
Films directed by John Frankenheimer
Films scored by Gary Chang
Films with screenplays by Elmore Leonard
Films set in 1986
Films set in Los Angeles
Films shot in Los Angeles
Golan-Globus films
Films about snuff films
Films produced by Menahem Golan
Films produced by Yoram Globus
1980s American films